The Annual Review of Pharmacology and Toxicology is a peer-reviewed academic journal that publishes review articles about pharmacology and toxicology. It was first published in 1961 as the Annual Review of Pharmacology, changing its name in 1976 to the present title. As of 2022, it has an impact factor of 16.459.

History
The Annual Review of Pharmacology was first published in 1961. Its founding editor was Windsor C. Cutting, who was also the founding editor of the Annual Review of Medicine in 1950. Its initial editorial committee overlapped with that of Pharmacological Reviews so that the two journals would not duplicate each other's efforts. In 1976 its name was changed to its current version, the Annual Review of Pharmacology and Toxicology.

It defines its scope as covering various aspects of pharmacology and toxicology, including biochemical receptors, transporters, enzymes, drug development, the immune system, central and autonomic nervous systems, gastrointestinal system, cardiovascular system, endocrine system, and respiratory system. As of 2022, Journal Citation Reports lists the journal's 2021 impact factor as 16.459, ranking it first of 94 journal titles in the category "Toxicology" and sixth of 279 titles in the category "Pharmacology & Pharmacy". It is abstracted and indexed in Scopus, Science Citation Index Expanded, MEDLINE, Aquatic Sciences and Fisheries Abstracts, and Academic Search, among others.

Editorial processes
The Annual Review of Pharmacology and Toxicology is helmed by the editor or the co-editors. The editor is assisted by the editorial committee, which includes associate editors, regular members, and occasionally guest editors. Guest members participate at the invitation of the editor, and serve terms of one year. All other members of the editorial committee are appointed by the Annual Reviews board of directors and serve five-year terms. The editorial committee determines which topics should be included in each volume and solicits reviews from qualified authors. Unsolicited manuscripts are not accepted. Peer review of accepted manuscripts is undertaken by the editorial committee.

Editors of volumes
Dates indicate publication years in which someone was credited as a lead editor or co-editor of a journal volume. The planning process for a volume begins well before the volume appears, so appointment to the position of lead editor generally occurred prior to the first year shown here. An editor who has retired or died may be credited as a lead editor of a volume that they helped to plan, even if it is published after their retirement or death.

 Windsor C. Cutting (1961–1964)
 Henry W. Elliott (1965–1976)
 Robert George and Ronald Okun (1977–1989)
 Robert George (1990)
 Arthur K. Cho (1991–2012)
 Paul A. Insel (2013–present)

Current editorial committee
As of 2022, the editorial committee consists of the editor and the following members:

 Susan G. Amara
 Terrence F. Blaschke
 Urs A. Meyer
 Amrita Ahluwalia
 Max Costa
 Annette C. Dolphin
 Lorraine J. Gudas
 Dan M. Roden

See also
 List of pharmaceutical sciences journals

References

 

Pharmacology and Toxicology
English-language journals
Annual journals
Publications established in 1961
Pharmacology journals
Toxicology journals